Alan Mahar (born 1949) is an English author and publisher.

Biography
Born in Liverpool, Mahar studied at the University of London before moving to Birmingham in 1976, working at Solihull College and living first in Sparkhill and then in Moseley.

He was a founder of the Tindal Street Fiction Group in 1982, and of the Tindal Street Press, where he is now the Publishing Director, in 1998.

His 1999 novel Flight Patterns told the story of a French parachutist in Liverpool in 1957, while his 2002 second novel After the Man Before concerns urban renewal in 1980s Birmingham. Mahar has had short stories published in journals including the London Magazine and Critical Quarterly.

Published works
 Flight Patterns (Gollancz, 1999)
 After the Man Before (Methuen, 2002)

References

Living people
1949 births
Publishers from Liverpool
People from Birmingham, West Midlands
Novelists from Liverpool
English male novelists
English male short story writers
English short story writers
20th-century English novelists
21st-century English novelists
20th-century English male writers
21st-century English male writers